Georgios Korakakis (born 9 February 1976) is a Greek professional football manager and former player.

Playing career 
He played mostly in Atromitos F.C. and Chalkidona. He had 261 appearances in the Superleague Greece and Football League. On 14 September 2006, he was the first European Atromitos scorer in the match with Sevilla FC.

Managerial career 
On 18 June 2014, Georgios Korakakis, one of the most emblematic figures in the history of the club returned in Peristeri, as he took over the fortunes of Atromitos U20 for the 2014–15 season.

Managerial statistics

References

External links
Profile at epae.org

1976 births
Living people
Greek footballers
Atromitos F.C. players
Ethnikos Piraeus F.C. players
Diagoras F.C. players
Chalkidona F.C. players
Association football midfielders
Atromitos F.C. managers